Newberg is a city in Yamhill County, Oregon, United States. Located in the Portland metropolitan area, the city is home to George Fox University. As of the 2020 census, the city population was 25,138 making it the second most populous city in the county.

History

Ewing Young, after leading pioneering fur brigades in California, came to Portland in 1834 and settled on the west bank of the Willamette River near the mouth of Chehalem Creek, opposite of Champoeg. Young's home is believed to be the first house built by European-Americans on that side of the river. Later, Joseph Rogers settled near the Willamette River at what is now Newberg in 1848. The community was known early on as Chehalem, and later as Roger's Landing for Rogers who founded the settlement, and who died in 1855. In 1883, the community was platted. Incorporated in 1889, a community tradition states that this town was named by its first postmaster, Sebastian Brutscher, for his former hometown of Neuberg in Germany One of the current streets, Brutscher Street, is named after Brutscher.

Newberg was one of the first communities in Oregon to hold Quaker services. It was incorporated as a city in 1889. The city's oldest surviving newspaper, The Newberg Graphic, was established Dec. 1, 1888. Friends Pacific Academy, renamed Pacific College in 1891 and then George Fox University in 1949, was founded by the Quakers in 1885. George Fox University is classified by U.S. News & World Report as a first-tier regional university and "Best Value" school.  The campus resides in the center of the city, surrounded by university-owned housing.

Herbert Hoover moved to the city in 1885, to live with his uncle and aunt after the death of his parents and was one of the first students to attend his uncle's Pacific Academy. The home has been turned into the Hoover-Minthorn House museum.

The town was "dry", meaning no alcohol could be sold within the city limits, for a good part of its early history.

The first domesticated Llama was brought to Newberg in 1972, and the town quickly became the leader in llama breeding in the Pacific Northwest by 1982.

Geography
Springbrook, once a separate community, is now considered part of Newberg.

It averages  in elevation.

Climate

Newberg, like Portland, has a warm-summer Mediterranean climate (Köppen Csb) with cool and cloudy winters, and warm and dry summers.
This climate is characterized by having overcast, wet, and changing weather conditions in fall, winter, and spring, as Newberg lies in the direct path of the stormy westerly flow, and mild and dry summers when the Pacific High reaches its northernmost point in mid summer. According to the Köppen climate classification, Newberg falls within the dry-summer temperate zone (Csb). with a USDA Plant Hardiness Zones between 8b and 9a. Other climate systems, such as the Trewartha climate classification, place it within the oceanic zone (Do), like much of the Pacific Northwest and Western Europe.

Winters are cool, cloudy, and rainy. Evening temperatures fall to or below freezing 33 nights per year on average, but very rarely to or below . There are only 2.1 days per year where the daytime high temperature fails to rise above freezing.

Annual snowfall in Newberg falls during the December-to-March time frame. Newport, for example, has more frequent snow than Portland, due in part to higher elevations near the West Hills and Mount Tabor, so can experience a dusting of snow while downtown Portland receives no accumulation at all.

Summers in Newberg are warm, occasionally hot, dry, and sunny, though the sunny warm weather is short-lived, from mid June through early September. Because of its inland location  from the coast, as well as the protective nature of the Oregon Coast Range to its west, Newberg summers are less susceptible to the moderating influence of the nearby Pacific Ocean. However, on average, temperatures reach or exceed  on only 56 days per year, of which about 12 days will reach  and only 1–2 days will reach .

Spring and fall can bring variable weather, including warm fronts that send temperatures surging above  and cold snaps that plunge daytime temperatures into the 40s °F (4–9 °C). However, lengthy stretches of overcast days beginning in mid fall and continuing into mid spring are most common. Rain often falls as a light drizzle for several consecutive days at a time, contributing to 152 days on average with measurable (≥) precipitation annually.

Demographics

2010 census
As of the census of 2010, there were 22,068 people, 7,736 households, and 5,398 families living in the city. The racial makeup of the city was 85.9% White, 0.8% African American, 0.8% Native American, 2.2% Asian, 0.2% Pacific Islander, 7.0% from other races, and 3.1% from two or more races. Hispanic or Latino of any race were 13.5% of the population.

There were 7,736 households, of which 37.4% had children under the age of 18 living with them, 53.1% were married couples living together, 12.0% had a female householder with no husband present, 4.7% had a male householder with no wife present, and 30.2% were non-families. 23.2% of all households were made up of individuals, and 9.8% had someone living alone who was 65 years of age or older. The average household size was 2.66 and the average family size was 3.12.

The median age in the city was 32.8 years. 25.2% of residents were under the age of 18; 13.8% were between the ages of 18 and 24; 27.1% were from 25 to 44; 21.9% were from 45 to 64; and 12% were 65 years of age or older. The gender makeup of the city was 48.6% male and 51.4% female.

2000 census
As of the census of 2000, there were 18,064 people, 6,099 households, and 4,348 families living in the city. The population density was 3,599.4 people per square mile (1,389.4/km). There were 6,435 housing units at an average density of 1,282.2 per square mile (494.9/km). The racial makeup of the city was 90.49% White, 0.35% African American, 0.64% Native American, 1.04% Asian, 0.17% Pacific Islander, 5.06% from other races, and 2.24% from two or more races. Hispanic or Latino of any race were 10.52% of the population.

There were 6,099 households, out of which 40.2% had children under the age of 18 living with them, 54.5% were married couples living together, 11.9% had a female householder with no husband present, and 28.7% were non-families. 21.7% of all households were made up of individuals, and 8.8% had someone living alone who was 65 years of age or older. The average household size was 2.76 and the average family size was 3.20.

In the city, the population was spread out, with 27.7% under the age of 18, 15.0% from 18 to 24, 29.8% from 25 to 44, 16.9% from 45 to 64, and 10.6% who were 65 years of age or older. The median age was 30 years. For every 100 females, there were 93.7 males. For every 100 females age 18 and over, there were 89.8 males.

The median income for a household in the city was $44,206.00, and the median income for a family was $51,084. Males had a median income of $34,099 versus $23,571 for females. The per capita income for the city was $16,873. About 4.3% of families and 6.6% of the population were below the poverty line, including 7.0% of those under age 18 and 6.1% of those age 65 or over.

Economy

As of 2002, dental equipment manufacturer A-dec was the city's largest employer with 832 employees, and George Fox University was second with 400. The next largest employers were SP Newsprint Co., Suntron Corp., and Providence Newberg Medical Center. Upon opening in September 2009, the Allison Inn and Spa, a 77-room destination hotel, spa, and restaurant employs approximately 200 full-time workers. A Hazelden Betty Ford Foundation inpatient addiction treatment center is located in the city.

Museums and other points of interest
 Ewing Young Historical Park
 Hoover-Minthorn House Museum

Education
Newberg is served by the Newberg School District, which has six elementary schools, two middle schools, and two high schools, Newberg High School and Catalyst Alternative High School. The town also has two private Christian schools (Veritas School and C. S. Lewis Academy). The city also is home to George Fox University, and a new campus of Portland Community College opened in fall 2011.

In September 2021, the Newberg School District received news coverage over several incidents involving racism and identity, starting when the school board voted to ban Pride and Black Lives Matter symbols in district schools. Later on in the month, Newberg High School students participated in a "virtual slave trade" which targeted black students at the school. On September 20, a Newberg Public Schools employee was placed on administrative leave after reporting for work while wearing blackface.

Media
 The Newberg Graphic

Transportation

Road

Air
 Chehalem Airpark
 Sportsman Airpark

Rail

Newberg is served by the Portland & Western Railroad which offers freight service as needed.  The railroad was originally part of the Southern Pacific Railroad and was built in the 1870s.  Newberg has not had regular passenger railroad service since the 1930s; however there have been several studies to consider bringing commuter rail service to the Portland metropolitan area.

Notable people
 Sage Canaday, American long-distance runner and ultramarathoner
 Mindy Duncan, Miss Oregon Teen USA 1988, Miss Teen USA 1988
 Herbert Hoover, 31st President of the United States
 Alex Schomburg, comic book illustrator
 Walter T. West, Oregon politician and farmer
 Ewing Young, early Oregon explorer, trapper, settler, and businessman

Sister cities
  Asago, Hyōgo Prefecture, Japan
  Poysdorf, Mistelbach, Lower Austria, Austria

References

External links

 Entry for Newberg in the Oregon Blue Book

 
Cities in Oregon
Populated places established in 1889
Portland metropolitan area
Cities in Yamhill County, Oregon
1889 establishments in Oregon
Populated places on the Willamette River